Viracopos – Campinas International Airport  (sometimes referred to as São Paulo/Campinas or São Paulo/Viracopos) is an international airport serving the municipality of Campinas, in the state of São Paulo. On 6 January 1987, the airport name was officially normalised to its present form. It is named after the neighbourhood where it is located.

It is operated by Aeroportos Brasil.

History

The IATA airport code of Viracopos is VCP and the specific city code of Campinas is CPQ. Sometimes both codes are used as one although there is a distinction between them in airline reservation systems: VCP, together with CGH (Congonhas) and GRU (Guarulhos), is part of the multiple airport system set around the city of São Paulo (code SAO). An airline that files services with the code VCP has flights displayed when passengers or travel agents request service from São Paulo, whereas flights filed with the code CPQ are displayed as service from Campinas, not São Paulo. A similar example is New York City (NYC), in which the airport codes LGA (LaGuardia Airport), JFK (John F. Kennedy International Airport), and EWR (Newark Liberty International Airport) are used for the same city, although Newark is located in a different city and state.

There are two versions of the origin of the name Viracopos, which means "turn (or overturn) glasses" in Portuguese and can be metaphorically understood as drinking a large amount of an alcoholic beverage at once. According to the first version, in the beginning of the 20th century, during an annual fair, there was a misunderstanding between the parish priest and the residents of the neighborhood. This resulted in excessive drinking and quarrels, in which the festival booths were torn down, or overturned, during the confusion. The name "Viracopos" was later used by the priest in sermons to refer to the event. Another version says that, on the site of the present airport, previously there had been a bar where herders had regularly met to exchange views and drink ("turn glasses"). So "Viracopos" was first the name of the district and later of the airport.

Viracopos's origin can be traced to a simple airfield near Campinas built during the 1932 Constitutionalist Revolution in São Paulo. During the 1950s it started being used by cargo companies. In 1960 it was improved with a 3,240 m runway, long enough to accommodate the first generation of intercontinental jet planes such as the Boeing 707, de Havilland Comet, Vickers VC10, Convair 990, and Douglas DC-8, and received its first international flight. Furthermore, Viracopos served (and still serves) as an alternate airport for Rio de Janeiro-Galeão International Airport and São Paulo airports particularly because it rarely closes due to bad weather conditions (an average of only 5 days per year). Soon airlines such as Varig, VASP and Real established services to Viracopos.

After 1960, Viracopos became the international airport for São Paulo, because the runway of São Paulo-Congonhas Airport was too short to accommodate intercontinental jet planes. In practice, however, the distance of nearly 100 km from Viracopos to São Paulo made it very inconvenient for passengers and airlines. As a result, direct international passenger service was limited, because most international passengers simply opted to fly instead to Rio de Janeiro-Galeão International Airport and then connect to Congonhas Airport, which is located very close to downtown. At that time, Viracopos even appeared on the Guinness Book of Records as the furthest airport from the city it allegedly served.

The position of international airport of São Paulo was lost in 1985 with the opening of Guarulhos International Airport and Viracopos entered into a decade of stagnation, with all international and most domestic flights transferred to Guarulhos and Congonhas.

However, recognizing the strategic importance of Viracopos for the economy, Infraero, the airport administrator in 1995 started to implement a master plan of renovations aiming at the building of a new airport, focusing its efforts on the segment of cargo transportation. The first phase was completed in the first half of 2004, when the airport received new passenger departure and arrival lounges, public areas, commercial concessions and a new cargo terminal. The second phase of the passenger terminal expansion project was completed in 2005 and a new control tower was built, storage and processing facilities for the cargo terminal expanded, and the passenger terminal was entirely revamped. A third phase of expansion, which would build a second runway by 2013, was projected. However, since the airport was conceded in 2012, the deadline for the new runway was postponed until 2018.

Being the second busiest cargo airport in Brazil, Viracopos has 77,000 square meters (646,000 square feet) of cargo terminals, 1,700 square meters (18,300 square feet) for animal cargo, and 1,480 cubic meters (52,200 square feet) of refrigerated space. As a major import/export hub, Viracopos enjoys 'express lanes' for courier traffic which are exceptionally quick and unbureaucratic by Brazilian standards.

Between 2008 and 2010, passenger traffic grew from 1.02 million in 2008 to 7.5 million in 2011. The airport can handle 7 million passengers/year. The number of flights offered has increased dramatically since Azul Brazilian Airlines made Viracopos its main hub.

On 31 August 2009, the previous operator Infraero unveiled a R$2,814 million (US$1,482.6 million; €1,038.8 million) investment plan to up-grade Viracopos International Airport focusing on the preparations for the 2014 FIFA World Cup and the Summer Olympics in 2016 which are held in Brazil. The investment intended to provide infra-structure to the airport, alleviating the air-traffic concentrated at São Paulo-Guarulhos International Airport. The investment was supposed to be distributed as follows:
Construction of a second runway
Construction of phase 1 of a new passenger terminal
Construction of the CPTM train to Campinas and São Paulo
Flights to NYC-JFK (originally planned for June 2020, but cancelled due to the COVID-19 pandemic)

However, due to legal and bureaucratic issues, the Infraero original plan never occurred. Since the concession to Consortium Aeroportos Brasil, a new investment program focusing particularly on the construction of a new terminal was announced. The phase 1 of the new passenger terminal opened in May 2015.

Following a decision made on 26 April 2011 by the Federal Government for private companies being granted concessions to operate some Infraero airports, on 6 February 2012, the administration of the airport was conceded, for 30 years, to the Consortium Aeroportos Brasil composed by the Brazilian Triunfo, an Investments and Funds Society (45%), UTC Engenharia e Participações, an Engineering and Investments Society (45%), and the French Aeroports Egis Avia (10%). Infraero, the state-run organization, remains with 49% of the shares of the company incorporated for the administration.

Airlines and destinations

Passenger

Cargo

Statistics

Accidents and incidents
23 November 1961: an Aerolíneas Argentinas de Havilland DH-106 Comet 4 registration LV-AHR operating flight 322 from Campinas-Viracopos to Port of Spain after reaching an altitude of about 100m lost altitude, collided with a eucalyptus forest and crashed. All 12 crew and 40 passengers on board were killed. The accident was attributed to pilot error.
13 October 2012: a Centurion Air Cargo McDonnell Douglas MD-11 registration N988AR operating flight 425 from Miami to Campinas-Viracopos lost a landing gear while landing on runway 15, causing damage to both the aircraft and runway. No injuries were reported. Following the incident, the airport was closed for 45 hours before the damaged aircraft was removed and the runway reopened. This caused a major traffic disruption with the airlines that operate at the airport. This also marked the first time Viracopos Airport had been closed other than weather, ending the airport's 52 year clean record.

Access

See also
List of airports in Brazil

References

External links

Airports in São Paulo (state)
Airports established in 1960
Transport in Campinas
1960 establishments in Brazil